{|

{{Infobox ship career
| Hide header = 
| Ship country = United States
| Ship flag = 
| Ship name = Enterprise
| Ship namesake = 
| Ship ordered = 15 November 1957
| Ship builder = Newport News Shipbuilding and Drydock Company
| Ship original cost = $451.3 million ($ in  dollars)
| Ship laid down = 4 February 1958
| Ship launched = 24 September 1960
| Ship christened = 24 September 1960
| Ship acquired = 29 October 1961
| Ship commissioned = 25 November 1961
| Ship deactivation = 1 December 2012
| Ship decommissioned = 3 February 2017
| Ship in service = 12 January 1962
| Ship refit = 27 September 1994
| Ship reclassified = CVN-65 from CVA(N)-65
| Ship out of service = 1 December 2012
| Ship struck = 3 February 2017
| Ship honors = 
| Ship status = Awaiting recycling at HII Shipyard, Newport News, Virginia
| Ship motto = *We are Legend;
 Ready on Arrival; The First, the Finest;
 Eight Reactors, None Faster
| Ship nickname = Big E
| Ship badge or crest = 
| Ship badge = 
| Ship notes = 
}}

|}

USS Enterprise (CVN-65), formerly CVA(N)-65, is a decommissioned United States Navy aircraft carrier. In 1958, she was the first nuclear-powered aircraft carrier and the eighth United States naval vessel to bear the name. Like her predecessor of World War II fame, she is nicknamed "Big E". At , she is the longest naval vessel ever built and the only ship of a class that was originally planned to have five other ships. She was inactivated on 1 December 2012, and officially decommissioned on 3 February 2017, after over 55 years of service."World's First Nuclear-powered Aircraft Carrier, the Big E, makes final voyage". foxnews.com, 10 March 2012. She was stricken from the Naval Vessel Register the same day.

The name has been adopted by the future  .

Design

Designed under project SCB 160, Enterprise was intended as the first of a class of six carriers, but massive increases in construction costs led to the remaining vessels being cancelled. Enterprise is the only aircraft carrier to house more than two nuclear reactors, having an eight-reactor propulsion design, with each A2W reactor taking the place of one of the conventional boilers in earlier constructions. She is the only carrier with four rudders, two more than other classes, and features a more cruiser-like hull.

Armament
Because of the huge cost of her construction, Enterprise was launched and commissioned without the planned RIM-2 Terrier missile launchers. Initially, the carrier had little defensive armament. Late in 1967, Enterprise was fitted with a prototype Basic Point Defense Missile System (BPDMS) installation, with two eight-round box launchers for Sea Sparrow missiles. A third BPDMS launcher was fitted during the ship's refit in 1970–1971.

Later upgrades added two NATO Sea Sparrow (NSSM) and three Mk 15 Phalanx CIWS gun mounts. One CIWS mount was later removed and two 21-cell RIM-116 Rolling Airframe Missile launchers were added..

RadarEnterprise had a phased array radar system known as SCANFAR. SCANFAR was intended to be better at tracking multiple airborne targets than conventional rotating antenna radars. SCANFAR consisted of two radars, the AN/SPS-32 and the AN/SPS-33. The AN/SPS-32 was a long-range air search and target acquisition radar developed by Hughes for the U.S. Navy. The AN/SPS-32 operated together with the AN/SPS-33, which was the square array used for 3D tracking, into one system. It was installed on only two vessels, Enterprise and the cruiser , placing a massive power drain on the ship's electric system.

The technology of the AN/SPS-32 was based on vacuum tubes and the system required constant repairs. The SPS-32 was a phased array radar which had a range of 400 nautical miles against large targets, and 200 nautical miles against small, fighter-size targets. These early phased arrays, replaced around 1980, were responsible for the distinctive square-looking island.

The AN/SPS-32 and AN/SPS-33 radars, while ahead of their time, suffered from issues relating to the electrical beam steering mechanism and were not pursued in further ship classes. While they are considered to be an early form of "phased array" radar, it would take the later technology of the Aegis phased array AN/SPY-1 with its electronically controlled beam steering to make phased array radars both reliable and practical for the USN. The dome above the SCANFAR contained the unique electronic warfare suite, the Andrew Alford AA-8200 dipole antennas (which never acquired a military designation). The system consisted of six rows of antennae encircling the dome. The antennas in the upper two rows were encased in piping radomes as they were small and fragile.

History

Commissioning and trials

In 1958, Enterprises keel was laid at Newport News Shipbuilding and Drydock Company in Shipway 11. On 24 September 1960, the ship was launched, sponsored by Mrs. W. B. Franke, wife of the former Secretary of the Navy. On 25 November 1961, Enterprise was commissioned, with Captain Vincent P. de Poix, formerly of Fighting Squadron 6 on her predecessor, in command. On 12 January 1962, the ship made her maiden voyage starting an extensive shakedown cruise and a lengthy series of tests and training exercises designed to determine the full capabilities of the nuclear powered super carrier. A full-speed run with her escort, demonstrated the sheer power and speed of Enterprises novel nuclear propulsion plant; afterwards, Laffey radioed, "You win the race. Fuel gone, topside salted, crew wet, and engines tired." On 20 February 1962, Enterprise was a tracking and measuring station for the flight of Friendship 7, the Project Mercury space capsule in which Lieutenant Colonel John H. Glenn, Jr. made the first American orbital spaceflight. Enterprise completed shakedown activities at Naval Station Norfolk on 5 April 1962.

1960s
On 25 June 1962, Enterprise joined the 2nd Fleet on her initial operational deployment, carrying out training off the US East Coast, and took part in Exercise LantFlex 2-62, a nuclear strike exercise, in conjunction with the carrier  from 6–12 July. In August, the carrier joined the 6th Fleet in the Mediterranean Sea, returning to Norfolk, Virginia on 11 October 1962.

1962 Cuban Missile Crisis

In October 1962, Enterprise was dispatched to her first international crisis. Following revelations that the Soviet Union was constructing nuclear missile launch sites on Cuba, President John F. Kennedy ordered the United States Department of Defense to conduct a large-scale buildup. Among the preparations, the U.S. Atlantic Fleet readied large numbers of its ships. On 22 October, President Kennedy ordered a naval and air "quarantine" (blockade) on shipment of offensive military equipment to Cuba, and demanded the Soviets dismantle the missile sites there. By 28 October, the crisis was averted, after the United States secretly agreed to remove nuclear missiles from Italy and Turkey.

Second and third deployments

On 19 December 1962, a Grumman E-2 Hawkeye was catapulted off Enterprise in the first shipboard test of a nose-wheel launch bar designed to replace the catapult bridle. Minutes later, a second launch with a launch bar was made by a Grumman A-6A Intruder, demonstrating one of the primary design goals of reducing launch intervals.

In 1963–1964, now under command of Captain Frederick H. Michaelis, Enterprise made her second and third deployments to the Mediterranean. On 25 February 1964, a crewman of the Finnish merchant ship  was injured in a fall while the ship was in the vicinity of Souda Bay, Greece. Enterprise answered her call for assistance. A surgeon was transferred to Verna Paulin by helicopter. In October 1964, Enterprise returned to Newport News Shipbuilding and Dry Dock Company for her first Refueling and Overhaul. Enterprise emerged from her refit on 22 June 1965.

Vietnam deployments
In November 1965, the Enterprise was transferred to the Seventh Fleet, home-ported at NAS Alameda, California. The following month, on 2 December, she became the first nuclear-powered ship to engage in combat when she launched aircraft against the Viet Cong near Biên Hòa City. Enterprise launched 125 sorties on the first day, unleashing  of bombs and rockets on the enemy's supply lines. On 3 December, she set a record of 165 strike sorties in a single day.

In January 1966, the aircraft carrier was continuing operations as a unit of Task Force 77 in the Gulf of Tonkin, as the flagship of Rear Admiral Henry L. Miller, Commander Carrier Division Three. Under the command of Captain James L. Holloway III, she was carrying a complement of approximately 350 officers and 4,800 men. Four West coast squadrons of CVW-9, commanded by Commander F. T. Brown, were embarked; VF-92, under Commander E. A. Rawsthorne, and VF-96, under Commander R. D. Norman, flying F-4B Phantom IIs; VA-93 under Commander A. J. Monger, and VA-94, under Commander O. E. Krueger, flying A-4C Skyhawks. With these squadrons were three others based on the East Coast; VA-36, under Commander J. E. Marshall, VA-76, under Commander J. B. Linder, flying A-4C Skyhawks; and RVAH-7, under Commander K. Enny, flying RA-5C Vigilantes. Rear Admiral Miller was relieved as Commander Carrier Division Three by Rear Admiral T. J. Walker on 16 February 1966. During the change of command ceremony on the flight deck, Rear Admiral Miller praised the ship's performance in his farewell remarks, and presented air medals to more than 100 pilots and flight officers.

The ship tied up at Leyte Pier, U.S. Naval Base Subic Bay, on the evening of 8 December 1966. Loading of supplies for the first line period was started immediately. Rear Admiral Walter L Curtis, Jr, Commander Carrier Division Nine, brought his flag aboard.

When Enterprise departed the Gulf of Tonkin on 20 June 1967, her pilots had flown more than 13,400 battle missions during 132 combat days of operations.(Enterprise Command History 1967, 29) As Vice Admiral Hyland stated in his congratulatory statement, "the entire Air Wing Nine has earned a resounding 'Well Done'." The carrier had steamed 67,630 miles in operations with the Seventh Fleet. She arrived in Subic Bay on 22 June and departed on 25 June for return to Alameda on 6 July 1967.

At Alameda, Enterprise began an overhaul. Captain Kent Lee relieved Captain James L. Holloway as commanding officer in ceremonies on 11 July 1967. Shipyard work was completed on 5 September 1967, and after completing sea trials on 7 September, Enterprise steamed south from San Francisco Bay to San Diego to reembark CVW-9 and get underway for refresher training off the California coast.Enterprise was visiting Sasebo, Japan in January 1968 when the US intelligence ship  was seized by North Korea, and she served as flagship of TF 71 (Rear Admiral Epes), which had been formed in response and they operated near South Korean waters for almost a month, during Operation Formation Star. When diplomatic negotiations had defused tensions, Enterprise and her escorts were released to head south to Yankee Station on 16 February 1968. Enterprise returned to NAS Alameda on 18 July 1968, having completed 12,839 catapult launches, with 12,246 sorties—9,182 of them combat. After a short overhaul in Puget Sound Naval Shipyard from 29 July to 26 September, she returned to Alameda to prepare for another deployment to Vietnam.

1969 fire

The explosion set off fires and additional explosions across the flight deck.

The fires were brought under control relatively quickly (when compared with previous carrier flight deck fires), but 27 sailors were killed and an additional 314 sailors were injured. The fire destroyed 15 aircraft, and the resulting damage forced Enterprise to put in for repairs at Pearl Harbor Naval Shipyard, Hawaii, primarily to repair the flight deck's armored plating. On 1 March 1969, repairs to the ship were completed and the ship proceeded on her scheduled western Pacific (WESTPAC) deployment to Vietnam and the Tonkin Gulf. These destinations would be delayed by events in the eastern Sea of Japan.

Korean operations
On 14 April 1969, tensions with North Korea flared again as a North Korean aircraft shot down a Lockheed EC-121 Warning Star that was on a reconnaissance patrol over the eastern Sea of Japan from its base at Atsugi, Japan. The entire 31-man crew was killed. The US responded by activating Task Force 71 (TF 71) to protect future such flights over those international waters. Enterprise arrived on station with TF 71 in late April after completion of repairs. The ships for TF 71 came mostly from Southeast Asia duty. This deployment became one of the largest shows of force in the area since the Korean War.

1970s
In 1969–1970, Enterprise returned to Newport News Shipbuilding and went through an overhaul and her second refitting. In January 1971, she completed sea trials with newly designed nuclear reactor cores that contained enough energy for 10 years. On 11 June 1971 Enterprise, with Captain Forrest S. Petersen now in command and Carrier Air Wing Fourteen (CVW-14) onboard, then departed for Vietnam again.

South and Southeast AsiaEnterprise,  and  launched a total of 2,001 strike sorties by 30 July 1971. Strike operations in July were disrupted when the carriers on station evaded three typhoons: Harriet, Kim and Jean. A slight increase in South Vietnam strike sorties occurred during the month. These were mainly visual strikes against enemy troop positions and in support of U.S. helicopter operations. From August–November 1971, Enterprise was in operations on Yankee Station.

In December 1971, Captain Ernest E. Tissot, Jr. assumed command, and Enterprise was deployed to the Bay of Bengal, during the Indo-Pakistani War of 1971 as a show of strength against India's naval blockade by INS Vikrant. Later a Soviet Navy submarine was also trailing the U.S. task force. A confrontation was averted when Enterprise moved away from the Indian Ocean toward Southeast Asia. Enterprise completed its deployment on 12 february 1972.Enterprise returned to the South China Sea from 12 September 1972 with CVW-14 onboard. On 18 December 1972, the United States resumed bombing campaigns above the 20th parallel under the name Linebacker II. During Linebacker II operations, Enterprise and other carriers on station reseeded the mine fields in Haiphong harbor and conducted concentrated strikes against surface-to-air missile and anti-aircraft artillery sites, enemy army barracks, petroleum storage areas, Haiphong naval and shipyard areas, and railroad and truck stations. Navy tactical air attack sorties under Linebacker II were centered in the coastal areas around Hanoi and Haiphong. There were 705 Navy sorties in this area during Linebacker II. Between 18 and 22 December, the Navy conducted 119 Linebacker II strikes in North Vietnam, with the main limiting factor on airstrikes being bad weather. In December 1972, the North Vietnamese returned to the peace table and Linebacker II ended. In January 1973, the Vietnam cease-fire was announced and American carriers ceased all combat sorties into North and South Vietnam. From 28 January 1973, aircraft from Enterprise and Ranger flew 81 combat sorties against lines-of-communication targets in Laos. The corridor for overflights was between Huế and Da Nang in South Vietnam. These combat support sorties were flown in support of the Laotian government, which had requested this assistance. Laos had no relationship with the ceasefire in Vietnam. Enterprise completed its deployment on 12 June 1973.

Post-Vietnam
After the cease-fire in Vietnam in 1973, Enterprise proceeded to the Puget Sound Naval Shipyard, Bremerton, Washington, where the carrier was altered and refitted to support the Navy's newest fighter aircraft – the Grumman F-14 Tomcat. Two of four jet blast deflectors were enlarged to accommodate the Tomcat. The No. 4 propulsion shaft was replaced; it had been bent when its screw became fouled in a discarded arresting gear cable.

On 18 March 1974, the first operational Tomcats of VF-1 Wolfpack and VF-2 Bounty Hunters made their maiden takeoffs and landings from the carrier. In September 1974, Enterprise became the first carrier to deploy with the new fighter plane when she made her seventh WESTPAC deployment.

In February 1975, Typhoon Gervaise struck the island nation of Mauritius, and Enterprise was ordered to provide disaster relief. Arriving at Port Louis, carrier personnel spent more than 10,000 man-hours rendering such assistance as restoring water, power and telephone systems, clearing roads and debris, and providing helicopter, medical, food and drinkable water support to the stricken area.

Operation Frequent Wind

On 29 April, Operation Frequent Wind was carried out by U.S. Navy and U.S. Marine Corps helicopters from the 7th Fleet. The Operation involved the evacuation of American citizens and "at-risk" Vietnamese from Saigon, the capital of South Vietnam under heavy attack from the invading forces of North Vietnam.

President Gerald Ford ordered helicopter evacuation when PAVN shelling forced the cessation of fixed-wing evacuation from Tan Son Nhut Airport. With fighter cover provided by carrier aircraft, the helicopters landed at the US Embassy, Saigon and the DAO Compound to pick up evacuees. The last helicopter lifted off the roof of the United States Embassy at 7:53 am, local time, on 30 April 1975 carrying the last 11 Marine Security Guards. During Operation Frequent Wind, aircraft from Enterprise flew 95 sorties. VF-1 and VF-2, flying from Enterprise made the first combat deployment of the F-14 Tomcat.

Eighth and ninth deployments
In July 1976, Enterprise began her eighth Western Pacific deployment. Beginning in October she took part in the ANZUS exercise 'Kangaroo II' with ships of the Australian and New Zealand Navies.

One of the ports visited was Hobart, Tasmania in November 1976. It had also been the first time an American ship anchored in the capital's harbor, Hobart, since the early 1920s. A beer with a picture of the Enterprise for its label was just one of the commemorations received by the renowned nuclear carrier.

In February 1977, Idi Amin, the President of Uganda, made derogatory remarks against the United States in public and Americans in Uganda were taken hostage. This was several months after the Israeli raid at Entebbe airport. Enterprise and her escort ships were scheduled to transit home after a seven-month deployment, but having just left Mombasa after a port call, were directed to remain in the area and operated off the east African coast for about one week. The ship's Marine detachment and air wing prepared for a possible mission to rescue and evacuate the Americans, but Amin eventually released all the hostages. The ships then steamed across the Indian Ocean at high speed to make a previously scheduled final port call at NAS Cubi Point in the Philippines before returning to NAS Alameda.

In 1978, Enterprise underwent her ninth Western Pacific deployment, including port calls in Hong Kong, Perth, Australia, and Singapore. In January 1979, the carrier sailed into Puget Sound Naval Shipyard for a comprehensive 36-month overhaul. This overhaul modified the ship's superstructure – removing the SCANFAR radars and the unique inverted cone-shaped top section, which was three stories high. During the lengthy overhaul, Navy and shipyard personnel referred to Enterprise as Building 65.1980s

In 1982, the carrier made her 10th WESTPAC deployment. In April 1983, Enterprise ran aground on a sandbar in San Francisco Bay while returning from deployment and remained stuck there for several hours. Coincidentally, George Takei, who played Mr. Sulu, helmsman of the fictional starship , was aboard at the time as a guest of the navy. Even though groundings and collisions are usually career-ending events for U.S. warship captains, the captain at the time, Robert J. Kelly, who had already been selected for promotion to commodore, eventually became a four-star admiral and Commander-in-Chief of the U.S. Pacific Fleet.

In 1985, the Enterprise began training for her 11th WESTPAC deployment. Late at night on 2 November 1985 with Captain Robert L. Leuschner, Jr. on the bridge, she struck Bishop Rock on the Cortes Bank during flight exercises, damaging the outer hull with a gash more than 100 feet in length and knocking out of one screw, a chip whose size was illustrated with a photograph of a Navy diver stretched out and reclining inside the notch. The cost of repairing the damage was $17 million, and Leuschner was relieved of command on 27 January 1986 as a result of the incident, by Captain Robert J. Spane.

In 1986, the carrier made her 12th WESTPAC deployment, leaving on 15 January 1986. The Battle Group sailed directly for the Indian Ocean, with stops in Hawaii, Subic Bay, and Singapore. On 28 April 1986, Enterprise became the first nuclear-powered aircraft carrier to transit the Suez Canal. Enterprise entered the Mediterranean to support "Operation El Dorado Canyon", the US bombing of Libya. It was the ship's first visit to the Mediterranean in more than 22 years. During the deployment, Rear Admiral J.T. Howe was relieved as Commander Cruiser-Destroyer Group 3 by Rear Admiral Paul David Miller.

In February 1988, Enterprise underwent her 13th deployment and was assigned to Operation Earnest Will, escorting reflagged Kuwaiti oil tankers in the Persian Gulf. On 14 April, another Earnest Will ship, struck an Iranian mine in international waters. In response, the U.S. launched Operation Praying Mantis against Iranian targets, starting with two Iranian oil platforms that were being used as support bases for Iranian attacks on merchant shipping. Aircraft from Enterprises CVW-11 bombed two Iranian frigates, helping to sink one and damaged the other, and provided other air support for the strike.

In September 1989, Enterprise left Alameda and began her 14th overseas deployment, an around-the-world cruise that would end at the ship's new homeport of Naval Station Norfolk, Virginia. In early December 1989, Enterprise and Midway participated in Operation Classic Resolve, President George H. W. Bush's response to Philippine President Corazon Aquino's request for air support during the rebel coup attempt. Enterprise remained on station conducting flight operations in the waters outside Manila Bay until the situation subsided.

1990s
In October, the carrier moved to Newport News Shipbuilding for refueling and the Navy's largest complex overhaul refit ever attempted. On 27 September 1994, Enterprise returned to sea for sea trials, now with Captain Richard J. Naughton in command, during which she performed an extended full power run as fast as when she was new.

On 28 June 1996, Enterprise began her 15th overseas deployment. The carrier enforced no-fly zones in Bosnia as part of Operation Joint Endeavor and over Iraq as part of Operation Southern Watch. The deployment ended in December 1996, which also marked the end of active service for the Grumman A-6 Intruder from the Navy. February 1997, Enterprise entered Newport News Shipbuilding for an extended selective restrictive availability lasting four-and-a-half months.

In November 1998, following workups, Enterprise departed on her 16th overseas deployment, with CVW-3 embarked. On the night of 8 November, shortly after the start of the deployment, a Northrop Grumman EA-6B Prowler crashed into a Lockheed S-3 Viking on the carrier's flight deck. The mishap occurred as the EA-6B was landing during night carrier qualifications, striking the folded wings of the S-3, which had not yet cleared the landing area of the flight deck.

The four-man crew of the EA-6B perished when the aircraft hit the water, but the two crew members of the S-3 ejected. A fire broke out on the flight deck but was quickly extinguished by the flight deck crew. Three of the four members of the Prowler crew were lost at sea, and the remains of the fourth were recovered shortly after the crash. The crew of the Viking were rushed to the Naval Medical Center Portsmouth, Virginia. There were no other significant injuries. An exhaustive search for three missing EA-6B Prowler crew members was suspended after nearly 24 hours.

On 23 November 1998, Enterprise relieved  in the Persian Gulf.
 

During a port call in Jebel Ali, UAE, the carrier hosted former President George H. W. Bush and enjoyed a live concert by Grammy Award-winning rock group Hootie & the Blowfish.

Shortly after the Račak massacre and failure of Yugoslavian peace talks in Rambouillet, France, Enterprise quickly left a port visit in Cannes, France, to return to the Adriatic.

In early March 1999, Enterprise returned to the Persian Gulf to relieve  in support of Operation Southern Watch, returning to Norfolk in May 1999.

Enterprise Battle Group was the first to deploy with IT-21, which allowed unprecedented internal and external communication capabilities, including Internet, email, and television.

2000s

In March 2001, Enterprise took part in the exercise JTFEX 01-2 in the Caribbean Sea. U24, a Type 206 class diesel-electric submarine with the German Navy, managed to "sink" the Enterprise by firing flares and taking a photograph through its periscope.

On 25 April 2001, Enterprise began her 17th overseas deployment with CVW-8 embarked and Captain James A. Winnefeld, Jr. in command. From 18–28 June, the carrier and four escorts participated in an exercise with the Royal Navy in a joint and combined warfare training exercise in the North Sea, near the Hebrides and in Scotland.Enterprise was beginning her voyage home from the Persian Gulf when the September 11 attacks were carried out. Without orders, the carrier returned to the waters off Southwest Asia near the Persian Gulf, outrunning her escorts. In October 2001, the United States launched air attacks against Al-Qaeda training camps and Taliban military installations in Afghanistan. The actions were designed to disrupt the use of Afghanistan as a base for terrorist operations and to attack the military capability of the Taliban regime.

On 10 November, the carrier arrived at her home port of Norfolk, Virginia, 16 days later than originally planned. During her last day at sea, the ship hosted a live two-hour broadcast of ABC's Good Morning America. Garth Brooks performed a concert with Jewel from Enterprise on 21 November while she was docked in Norfolk, Virginia. The concert was carried live on CBS. On Pearl Harbor Day (7 December 2001), President George W. Bush addressed the sailors of Enterprise from its flight deck.

In January 2002, Enterprise entered the Norfolk Naval Shipyard, Portsmouth, Virginia for a scheduled one-year Extended Dry Docking Selected Restricted Availability.

Iraq War

Operation Iraqi Freedom

From September 2003 to February 2004, the ship deployed to relieve the four carriers that were on station during the invasion of Iraq. Enterprise's role was to provide continued air support for Operation Iraqi Freedom. The fully repaired  was a member of her escort group at this time. A USO tour was held aboard while at sea, with wrestler Kurt Angle, NASCAR racer Mike Wallace, and comedian Robin Williams giving talks and performances. The ship made several port-calls to Jebel Ali, a stop in Bahrain (during which actor Ben Affleck visited the ship), and Naples, Italy and Cartegna, Spain on the way home. Admiral James Stavridis commanded the battle group at this time with Captain Eric Neidlinger as Enterprises commanding officer.

2005 saw the ship in for another routine shipyard overhaul at Newport News Shipyard in Newport News, Virginia. Departing the dock after this yard period, Enterprise ran through a sand bar, causing all eight reactors to shut down, leaving the ship adrift on emergency power for nearly three hours before she was tugged back to her pier at Norfolk Naval Base. It took about three days for the ship's nuclear machinists to clear her condensers of river mud.

In May 2006, Enterprise departed for a six-month deployment, operating in the 6th, 5th and 7th Fleet areas in a world-tour, supporting Operations Iraqi and Enduring Freedom, and visiting ports in Dubai, Hong Kong, and crossing the line. She returned to Norfolk on 18 November 2006.

On 19 December 2007, the carrier returned home after a six-month deployment in the Persian Gulf.

In April 2008, Enterprise entered the Northrop-Grumman Newport News shipyard for a scheduled 18-month Extended Docking Selected Restricted Availability, with a projected completion date of September 2009. As maintenance was performed, costs continued to rise above projections and the completion date repeatedly slid. Enterprise, the oldest active combat vessel in the Navy, was scheduled to be decommissioned as late as 2014. On 6 April 2009, Admiral Gary Roughead, Chief of Naval Operations, said that he was seeking a congressional dispensation to speed up the process to decommission Enterprise. Under this new timetable, the ship would complete one final deployment before being decommissioned in late 2012 or early 2013. In October 2009, the House and Senate Armed Services Committees agreed with the recommendation, approving the decommissioning of Enterprise in 2013 after 51 years of service.

2010s

In April 2010, the Navy announced that the cost of refurbishing the carrier had risen to $655 million and was scheduled to be completed the same month. On 19 April 2010, Enterprise left the Northrop Grumman shipyard to conduct sea trials in preparation for return to the fleet. The total cost of refurbishing the carrier was $662 million, which was 46% over budget. Also, it took eight months longer than scheduled. The Navy said it planned to use the carrier for two six-month deployments before her scheduled 2013 decommissioning date.

On 1 January 2011, the Virginian-Pilot leaked highlights from the final video of a set entitled "XO Movie Night" that was filmed on Enterprise and aired via closed circuit television on select Saturday evenings. The videos, which were not meant for release outside the command, were produced by Captain Owen Honors when he was executive officer (XO) of the ship in the 2006–07 timeframe and included profanity, anti-gay slurs, and sexually suggestive scenes.

Captain Honors received public support from Navy personnel, but on 4 January 2011, Admiral John C. Harvey, Jr., the commander of the United States Fleet Forces Command in Norfolk removed Honors for demonstrating poor judgment. Captain Dee Mewbourne was appointed as replacement commander. Forty officers and enlisted sailors, including six flag officers, were later disciplined to varying extents over the incident.

The carrier and her strike group deployed on 13 January 2011. In February 2011, Enterprise was involved in an incident with Somali pirates, an event that ended in the deaths of four American citizens and two pirates.

The carrier returned to Norfolk on 15 July 2011. During its deployment, it had participated in operations that captured 75 Somali pirates and its strike group made missile strikes against the Libyan government.

On 17 August 2011, Captain William C. Hamilton, Jr. relieved Captain Dee L. Mewbourne as Enterprise's commanding officer.

The mission was described as routine, not a response to a specific threat. Upon completion of this cruise in fall 2012, Enterprise was scheduled to be deactivated.

In October 2012, Enterprise transited the Suez Canal for the final time. She paid her last foreign port call when she visited Naples, Italy, between 16–21 October, which had been the Big E's first foreign port-of-call fifty years earlier.

On 4 November 2012, Enterprise returned to her homeport at Naval Station Norfolk, Virginia, for the last time. While on her last journey, the carrier cruised nearly 81,000 miles in a 238-day deployment to the Persian Gulf and her aircraft flew more than 2,000 sorties in support of Operation Enduring Freedom in Afghanistan.

DecommissioningEnterprise was deactivated on 1 December 2012 at Norfolk Naval Station, Virginia. The deactivation of Enterprise resulted in a one-time increase of approximately $857.3 million in depot maintenance costs for the U.S. Navy's operation and maintenance budget for Fiscal Year 2013.Enterprise was the first nuclear-powered aircraft carrier to be decommissioned. Naval enthusiasts requested that Enterprise be converted into a museum. By 2012 this was deemed too expensive to make such an effort practical, in addition to the fact that the ship would need to be partially dismantled anyway to remove the eight reactors safely. A petition was also set up for the next carrier to be named as the ninth USS Enterprise.

At her inactivation ceremony, Secretary of the Navy Ray Mabus announced that the next Gerald R. Ford-class carrier, would be named Enterprise. VIPs present for the ceremony included several former commanding officers, a granddaughter of the ship's sponsor, and a former A-6 pilot, Eugene McDaniel, who had been shot down and captured in North Vietnam and was returning to the ship for the first time since the day he was shot down.

On 8 February 2013, the United States Department of Defense announced that a number of nuclear projects would have to be postponed until the upcoming budget sequestration issue was resolved. These include the planned de-fuelling of Enterprise as well as mid-life overhauls (including nuclear refuelling) for two  ships. The contract for defueling Enterprise was eventually awarded to Huntington Ingalls Industries in June 2013.

In October 2014, Newport News Shipbuilding announced that one of Enterprises anchors, removed from the ship during deactivation, had been transferred to the   during her RCOH. In early 2017, it was announced that steel from CVN-65 will be recycled and used to construct CVN-80. Over 35,000 pounds of steel has been removed from CVN-65 and repurposed into CVN-80. The crew of Enterprise's final deployment, built a time capsule, constructed from her steel and wood, to preserve the carrier's history for CVN-80.

The final reactor was defueled in December 2016, with decommissioning on 3 February 2017. The same day, the ship was stricken from the Naval Vessel Registry (NVR). According to Navy Sea Systems Command, the recycling of Enterprise was delayed by the Navy until further information on "more technically executable, environmentally responsible" approaches to disposing of the aircraft carrier are available. On 10 April 2018, Newport News Shipbuilding announced that Enterprises inactivation process has been completed. Enterprise will be stored at Hampton Roads until disposal plans can be determined by the Navy.

In 2019, one of Enterprises anchors was transferred to the Nimitz-class carrier , during her midlife refueling and overhaul at Huntington Ingalls Industries Newport News.

Overhauls

 April 1962 to June 1962 – Post Shakedown Availability
 November 1964 to July 1965 – Refueling and Complex Overhaul – mast raised, second yardarm added.
 1965-1966 Vietnam tour of duty
 June 1966 to September 1966 – Overhaul – waist catapult bridle catcher removed; 2 Mk-25 BPDM added.
 July 1967 to September 1967 – Limited Availability
 July 1968 to September 1968 – Overhaul
 January 1969 to March 1969 – Repairs – repairs to explosion and fire damage.
 August 1969 to January 1971 – Refueling and Complex Overhaul
 March 1972 to May 1972 – Selected Restricted Availability
 July 1973 to February 1974 – Selected Restricted Availability
 July 1975 to November 1975 – Selected Restricted Availability
 May 1977 to July 1977 – Selected Restricted Availability
 January 1979 to February 1982 – Complex Overhaul – mast replaced; ECM dome removed; SPS-32/33 arrays replaced with SPS-48/49; 3 CIWS added; forward port sponson added; forward starboard sponson with Mk-29 added; aft port BPDM replaced with Mk-29; aft starboard BPDM removed.
 May 1983 to September 1983 – Selected Restricted Availability
 November 1985 to January 1986 – Repairs – hull/keel/propeller repairs from collision with Cortes Bank, Channel Islands, California.
 September 1986 to March 1987 – Selected Restricted Availability
 October 1988 to April 1989 – Selected Restricted Availability
 October 1990 to September 1994 – Refueling and Complex Overhaul – aft boarding dock added.
 February 1997 to August 1997 – Selected Restricted Availability
 June 1999 to December 1999 – Selected Restricted Availability
 January 2002 to May 2003 – Selected Restricted Availability
 September 2004 to October 2005 – Selected Restricted Availability – RAM replaces CIWS at forward port sponson; RAM added to aft starboard sponson.
 May 2006 to November 2006 – Selected Restricted Availability
 April 2008 to April 2010 – Selected Restricted Availability

Awards and decorations

In popular cultureEnterprise first appeared in the 1968 movie Yours, Mine and Ours. Henry Fonda played the role of Frank Beardsley, a U.S. Navy warrant officer attached to the ship.Enterprise was a principal setting of the popular movie Top Gun released in 1986. Director Tony Scott filmed actual flight operations aboard ship and incorporated them into the film's plot.

In 1986, Enterprise was a setting of scenes in Star Trek IV: The Voyage Home. The ship was unavailable for filming, so scenes depicting Enterprise were again filmed aboard USS Ranger. More significant to Star Trek lore, the first nuclear aircraft carrier was in position to inspire naming of Starship . The original premise by Gene Roddenberry dated March 1964 describes a starship USS Yorktown. As USS Enterprise (CVN-65) was then one of the newest and most celebrated ships of the US Navy, occupying a similar status as the fictional Starship Enterprise, the aircraft carrier may have inspired a name change, though Roddenberry himself had already dispelled that notion in a 1973 radio interview, reaffirming that he had named his fictional starship after its illustrious World War II namesake. Nonetheless, one of Art Director Matt Jefferies' original drawings depicts the Starship Enterprise with Enterprise (CVN-65) for scale. Many of the subsequent Star Trek television shows and movies have been set aboard a ship named Enterprise, and the starship  of the show Star Trek: The Next Generation has a relief of five Enterprise starship models and a model of CVN-65 on the wall of its observation lounge. Furthermore, in the subsequent prequel series Star Trek: Enterprise, a quartet of portraits depicting vessels named Enterprise adorns the wall of Captain Jonathan Archer's ready room, the second of which is CVN-65. A similar display is seen on the recreation deck of the Enterprise in Star Trek: The Motion Picture. The Space Shuttle Enterprise (OV-101), originally slated to be named Constitution, was renamed after the Starship Enterprise following a write-in campaign to President Gerald Ford. In 1995, Enterprise (covered as the USS Seahawk) was also used to film scenes for the pilot episodes of the TV series "JAG".

See also
 Aerial warfare
 Air supremacy
 Carrier strike group
 Carrier battle group
 List of aircraft carriers
 List of aircraft carriers of the United States Navy
List of ships of the United States Navy named Enterprise
 Russian aircraft carrier Admiral Kuznetsov
 U.S. Carrier Group tactics
 Carrier Strike Group Twelve
 List of world's longest ships

References
Notes

Citations

Bibliography

 
 
 
 
 
 USS Enterprise (CVN 65) public affairs office
 

External links

 
 
 
 
 
 
 
 
 
 
 USS Enterprise'' (CVAN-65/CVN-65) command histories from Naval History & Heritage Command
 

Aircraft carriers of the United States Navy
1960 ships
Nuclear ships of the United States Navy
Cold War aircraft carriers of the United States
Vietnam War aircraft carriers of the United States
Ships built in Newport News, Virginia
Afghanistan War ships of the United States